Ayoze Placeres Delgado (born 31 July 1991) is a Spanish footballer who plays for Atlético Paso as a central defender.

Football career
Born in Santa Cruz de Tenerife, Canary Islands, Placeres finished his graduation with CD Tenerife's youth setup, and made his senior debuts with the reserves in the 2010–11 season, in Tercera División. On 21 May 2011 he made his official debut with the first team, starting and playing the full 90 minutes in a 2–1 away success over Albacete Balompié, in the Segunda División championship.

On 24 January 2013 Placeres was loaned to CD Marino, in Segunda División B. He subsequently resumed his career in that category, representing UD Las Palmas Atlético, FC Cartagena, Mérida AD, Burgos CF and Unionistas de Salamanca CF.

References

External links

1991 births
Living people
Footballers from Santa Cruz de Tenerife
Spanish footballers
Association football defenders
Segunda División players
Segunda División B players
Tercera División players
CD Tenerife B players
CD Tenerife players
CD Marino players
UD Las Palmas Atlético players
FC Cartagena footballers
Mérida AD players
Burgos CF footballers
Unionistas de Salamanca CF players
Yeclano Deportivo players